The Wilkinson Award is an Australian architectural prize presented by the Australian Institute of Architects (NSW Chapter) and was first awarded in 1961.

The medal is presented in memory of the Australian architect Leslie Wilkinson (12 October 1882 – 20 September 1973). Born in New Southgate, London, England he emigrated to Sydney in 1918 and became the first Dean of Architecture at the University of Sydney. The award recognises excellence in residential buildings.

List of recipients

References

External links
 Example of work by Leslie Wilkinson - 'Markdale' NSW
 

Architecture awards
Australian science and technology awards
Awards established in 1961